Forget Everything You Know is the final album released by the North Vancouver punk band d.b.s. It was released by Ache Records on April 1, 2001. Only 1,000 copies were pressed.

The band's sound on this album has been likened to The Promise Ring.

Track listing 
Music by Andy Dixon and d.b.s. Lyrics by Dixon, except tracks 3 and 5 by Jesse Gander.
 "The Weather or Not" – 2:57
 "Last Chance for a Bad Dance" – 4:36
 "Begin Again" – 5:39
 "Our Son, Arson" – 5:57
 "Letter to You" – 4:29

Personnel 
 Andy Dixon – guitar, backing vocals
 Jesse Gander – vocals
 Paul Patko – drums, backing vocals
 Ryan "Nordburg" Angus – bass guitar

References 

D.b.s. albums
2001 EPs